The Royal Corps of Transport (RCT) was a British Army Corps established to manage all matters in relation to the transport of men and material for the Army and the wider Defence community. It was formed in 1965 and disbanded in 1993; its units and trades were amalgamated into the Royal Logistic Corps. The Depot and Training Regiment RCT was at the former Buller Barracks in Aldershot garrison.

History
The corps was formed in 1965 from the transport (land, water and air) elements of the Royal Army Service Corps (RASC) and the movement control and transportation elements of the Royal Engineers (RE). The Royal Army Service Corps’ functions of supply and transport were separated. The RCT became responsible for transport including ships and launches. whilst supplies became the responsibility of the Royal Army Ordnance Corps. In 1993, following the Options for Change review, the Royal Logistic Corps (RLC) was formed by the amalgamation of The Royal Corps of Transport, the Royal Army Ordnance Corps, the Royal Pioneer Corps, the Army Catering Corps, and the Postal and Courier elements of the Royal Engineers.

Regiments 
Regiments of the Royal Corps of Transport with regiment, with last name, before disbandment:

 1st Armoured Division Transport Regiment
 2nd Infantry Division Transport Regiment
 3rd Armoured Division Transport Regiment
 4th Armoured Division Transport Regiment
 7th Tank Transporter Regiment
 8th Transport Regiment
 10th Corps Transport Regiment
 14th Air Dispatch Regiment
 15th Air Dispatch Regiment
 17th Port Regiment
 20th Maritime Regiment 
 21st (Northern Ireland) Transport and Movement Regiment
 23rd Transport and Movement Regiment
 24th Regiment
 25th Regiment
 26th Transport and Movement Regiment
 27th Regiment
 28th Transport and Movement Regiment
 29th Transport and Movement Regiment
 30th Regiment
 31st Regiment
 32nd Regiment
 33rd Maritime Regiment
 Other Units part of the Royal Corps of Transport
Maritime Group, Royal Corps of Transport
Headquarters Air Dispatch Group
1st Regiment, Royal Malta Artillery
2nd Transport Group
Logistic Support Group Regiment
Gurkha Transport Regiment
Parachute Logistic Regiment
Cyprus Logistic Unit
395 Air Dispatch Troop
MT Troop 22 Special Air Service
401 Troop
402 Troop
403 Troop
404 Troop
405 Troop
407 Troop
410 Troop
414 Pack Transport Troop
415 Maritime Troop
416 Troop
460 Port Troop (Falkland Islands)
486 Movement Control Troop
497 Movement Control Troop
Reserve Regiment
150 Transport Regiment
151 Transport Regiment
152 Transport Regiment
153 Transport Regiment
154 Transport Regiment
155 Transport Regiment
156 Transport Regiment
157 Transport Regiment
160 Transport Regiment
161 Ambulance Regiment
162 Movement Control Regiment
163 Movement Control Regiment

Trades 

The Royal Corps of Transport consisted of a number of different specialist trades. These included:

Driver was the primary trade of the RCT and as such private soldiers held the rank 'Driver'.
Driver (Responsible for General Duties and Driver tasks).
Driver Radio operator
Driver Tank Transporter
Driver Air Dispatcher
In conversation, the 'Driver' element was often omitted from these other Driver roles, even though the rank abbreviation of Dvr remained.

Clerical trades also completed basic driver training before going on to specialise
Clerk - Working within RCT Squadrons.
Movement controller previously referred to as Traffic Operator

Port and Specialised Support Trades, Port and Maritime specialists 
Again basic driver training was required
Driver Port Operator
Driver Railwayman (79 Railway Squadron RCT)
Mariner (Seaman)
Marine Engineer
Pilot - Hovercraft - for a very short period. Pilot was not really a trade but an appointment

RCT personnel served in additional roles
Staff car Driver could be carried out by any driver trade and additionally by those that carried out the Staff car Driver's course at the Army School of Mechanical Transport - (Later Defence School of Transport).
Airborne Forces as a Parachutist but stayed in trade, so not for sea, port and railway trades. N.B. Parachutist was never a trade in the RCT. However, 63 Parachute Squadron RCT was part of the Airborne Bde.
Royal Marines (Commando Logistic Regiment) Having completed the 'Army Commando Course'
Special Duties Teams in Northern Ireland
Master Driver

Additional Officer Information
The RCT provided the first Service Support Officer to the Commanding Officer 22 SAS (Brigadier Andrew Massey RCT, Later SAS, CO 22 SAS 1984–87)
Andrew Christopher Massey, soldier: born Carlisle, Cumberland 18 April 1943; MBE 1979, OBE 1987; Commanding Officer, 22 SAS Regiment 1984-87; Deputy Director, Special Forces 1990-91, Commandant, RCT Training Centre 1992-93; married 1977 Annabelle Cunningham (one son, one daughter); died Hereford 19 August 1998.

References

External links

British administrative corps
Military units and formations disestablished in 1993
Military units and formations established in 1965
Royal Logistic Corps